(born 6 April 1982) is a Spanish actor. He rose to prominence with his performance as El Duque in Sin tetas no hay paraíso. 

He has since played roles in series such as Velvet, Sense8, Narcos, 30 Coins and Sky Rojo.

Early life
Miguel Ángel Silvestre Rambla was born in Castellón de la Plana on 6 April 1982. He planned on becoming a professional tennis player before suffering an injury in a Hungarian tournament. He later decided to study physiotherapy until his aunt introduced him to the world of theatre.

He studied drama, physical theatre, modern dance and acrobatics before winning the Mister  2002 pageant.

Career
Silvestre made his feature film debut in the 2005 drama Life and Colour.

He stars in the Pedro Almodóvar film I'm So Excited and in the Spanish horror thriller Verbo. He also starred in the Spanish series Velvet as Alberto Marquez.

In 2015, the high-profile English-language Netflix drama Sense8 was released, in which Miguel plays one of the lead characters, a closeted action movie star named Lito Rodríguez, who lives in Mexico City with his boyfriend, Hernando (played by Alfonso Herrera).

In 2017, he joined the cast of Netflix series Narcos playing recurring character and real life member of the Cali Cartel, Franklin Jurado.

In 2020, it was announced that he had joined the cast of Money Heist Season 5 in an undisclosed role.

Filmography

Film

Television

Theater

References

External links 

 
 

1982 births
Living people
People from Castellón de la Plana
Spanish male film actors
Spanish male television actors
Spanish male stage actors
Male actors from the Valencian Community
21st-century Spanish male actors